Chiara Mingarelli is an Italian-Canadian astrophysicist who researches gravitational waves. She is an associate research scientist at the Flatiron Institute Center for Computational Astrophysics and an assistant professor of physics at the University of Connecticut. She is also a science writer and communicator.

Education 
Mingarelli grew up in Ottawa, Canada. She completed a bachelor's degree in mathematics and physics from Carleton University, Canada, in 2006. She moved to the University of Bologna to study for a Masters in Astrophysics and Cosmology, which she achieved in 2009. Mingarelli's PhD thesis "Gravitational Wave Astrophysics with Pulsar Timing Arrays", was selected by Springer Nature as an Outstanding PhD thesis in 2016. She earned her PhD at the University of Birmingham with Alberto Vecchio in 2014.

Research 
Mingarelli is a gravitational wave astrophysicist attempting to understand the merging of supermassive black holes. Mingarelli predicts the nanohertz gravitational wave signatures of such mergers. She will measure them using pulsar timing arrays, which can characterise the cosmic merger history of binary black hole systems. The systems emit nanohertz gravitational waves. After completing her PhD, Mingarelli was awarded a European Union Marie Curie International Fellowship, which she brought to the California Institute of Technology. There she continued to work on gravitational waves. At Caltech she taught students in the Gravitational Wave Astrophysics school about Pulsar Timing Arrays. Mingarelli spent the return phase of the Marie Curie Fellowship at the Max Planck Institute for Radio Astronomy. She is regularly an invited speaker at scientific conferences.

Public engagements 
Mingarelli appeared on Stargazing Live in 2012. She was featured on the BBC Radio Cambridgeshire show The Naked Scientists. In 2013 the Royal Astronomical Society selected Mingarelli as a Voice of the Future, and she attended an interview session at the House of Commons. She regularly appears on science themed podcasts and video series. She has been involved with Amy Poehler's Smart Girls, as a blogger and interviewee. After the first detection of gravitational waves, Mingarelli was featured in The New York Times. She has contributed to popular science journals, including Scientific American, Nautilus, The Wall Street Journal, Gizmodo, Wired and the New Scientist. Mingarelli maintains a social media presence on sites such as Twitter, where she is an advocate for "science, coffee and girl power".

Awards 
 Early Career Prize, High Energy Astrophysics Division of the American Astronomical Society, 2023
 SpringerNature Award for "Scientific Achievement", 2022 Runner Up
 Amazon Web Services ML Award — October 2018
 Marie Curie International Outgoing Fellowship — 2014 - 2017
 Marie Curie Actions “Communicating Science” Prize — 2017
 Woman Physicist of the Month, November 2016
 Springer Thesis Award — 2015

Publications 

 C. Xin, C. M. F. Mingarelli, J. S. Hazboun, Multimessenger pulsar timing arrayconstraints on supermassive black hole binaries traced by periodic light curves,submitted to ApJ, arXiv:2009.11865.

References 

Living people
Italian astrophysicists
Canadian astrophysicists
Italian women scientists
Science communicators
21st-century Italian scientists
21st-century Canadian physicists
21st-century Canadian women scientists
Carleton University alumni
University of Bologna alumni
Alumni of the University of Birmingham
California Institute of Technology faculty
Italian science writers
Canadian science writers
Women science writers
21st-century Italian women writers
21st-century Canadian women writers
21st-century Italian writers
21st-century Canadian non-fiction writers
Canadian women non-fiction writers
Year of birth missing (living people)